The Basilicata regional election of 2000 took place on 16 April 2000.

Filippo Bubbico (Democrats of the Left) was elected President, defeating Nicola Pagliuca (Forza Italia) by a landslide.

Results

Source: Ministry of the Interior

Notes and references

Elections in Basilicata
2000 elections in Italy